Monaco competed at the 2004 Summer Olympics in Athens, Greece, from 13 to 29 August 2004.

Athletics

Monégasque athletes have so far achieved qualifying standards in the following athletics events (up to a maximum of 3 athletes in each event at the 'A' Standard, and 1 at the 'B' Standard).

Men

Shooting

Women

Swimming

Men

See also
 Monaco at the 2005 Mediterranean Games

References

External links
Official Report of the XXVIII Olympiad
Comité Olympique Monégasque 

Nations at the 2004 Summer Olympics
2004 Summer Olympics
Summer Olympics